The notion of commercialization of love, that is not to be confused with prostitution (the commercialization of sexual activity), involves the definitions of romantic love and consumerism.

Sociological development

The commercialization of love is the ongoing process of infiltration of commercial and economical stimuli in the daily life of lovers and the association of monetary and non-monetary symbols and commodities in the love relationships.

The application of Habermas’ theory is helpful to fully understand the discussion of the relationship between the market and love. From the model of a two-tiered society postulated by Habermas (comprising the sphere of the systems and the life-world), Frankfurt School has affirmed that when romantic stimuli made with commercial proposes infiltrate the daily life of lovers it causes an undesired colonization of the life-world, thus reaffirming the irreducible contradiction between the economy and love.

In contemporary societies, the economy is present in several spheres of love, offering cultural products that embody its ideals and feelings and providing the contexts in which to experience the romantic rituals (i.e. love manuals, sex therapists and marriage crisis counselors).

Romantic love can be defined, according to Sérgio Costa, as a historical-cultural model that branches into five dimensions:
 In the field of the emotions, romantic love expresses itself in “a bond with the other that knows no more ardent desire than the yearning to lead one's own life in the body of the loved one”.
 As an idealization, it promises the individual full recognition of the others’ singularities (dimensions, peculiarities and individual idiosyncrasies).
 As a relationship model, it historically combines a fusion of sexual passion and emotional affection (i.e. marriage, love and family).
 As a cultural practice, romantic love corresponds to a repertoire of discourses, actions and rituals by means of which amorous emotions are evoked, perceived, transmitted and intensified.
 On the subject of social interactions, it corresponds to a radicalized form of what Luhmann described as "interpersonal interpenetration".

Two sociologists, in particular, have debated and analyzed in depth the theme of commercialization of love related to our society: Eva Illouz and Arlie R. Hochschild.

Eva Illouz
Eva Illouz is a professor of sociology at the Hebrew University of Jerusalem. Illouz's research has always focused on several different topics and themes such as the study of culture, communication and especially emotions. In particular, the theme of commercialization, or commodification, of love is well analyzed in her first book Consuming the Romantic Utopia, where indeed she describes how capitalism has transformed emotional patterns.
At the beginning of the book, it is examined how romantic love has changed during time also due to the newly expanding mass markets of leisure. This change lead to the creation of a new process called romanticization of commodities, that is a process in which commodities played a crucial role in experiencing emotions such as love or romance. In the 1930s, commodities of any kind such as jewelry, household appliances and even basic generic products were advertised in newspapers, magazines and also in movies as essential indicators that will enable people to fully live and experience romance.
Throughout the book, Illouz deals also with another process: the commodification of romance. She states that the practice of “dating” replaced the practice of “calling on a woman” and going to her parents’ house and it consequently moved romantic encounters from the home sphere to the sphere of consumption, that is going out on a date for example to the cinema or to have dinner in a fancy restaurant. The inscription of the romantic encounter into the leisure consumption’s sphere, due to the practice of dating, marked the entrance of romance in the market. All this was made possible, on one hand, by the availability of some goods and services such as cars or leisure travels that, until then, were reserved to the upper classes and, on the other, by the middle-classes’ adoption of the working class’ entertainments, such as going to the movie theatre.

A.R. Hochschild

Arlie Russell Hochschild is a sociologist and a professor emerita at the Berkeley University of California. During her career, she studied and examined topics like market culture, family global patterns of care work, and the relationships between culture and emotion.

She analyzed the linkage between love and market in several works, including The Outsourced Self: Intimate Life in Market Times (2012) and The Commercialization of Intimate Life: Notes from Home and Work (2003).

In her essay "The Commodity Frontier" (contained in The Commercialization of Intimate Life: Notes from Home and Work), she argued that the commodity frontier (the boundary between market commodities and emotions) has a double aspect: it is developed by both the market-place and the family. On the market side, this frontier represents for commercial companies an opportunity to develop new markets for products that  in the past were associated with the familiar environment in the past (for example nannies, birthday party planners, personal chefs and so on). On the other hand, the supply  of the products increases, with a growing number of families wants or desires to consume these services and goods. This particular market targets above all single men and women, or parents who spend most of their time working outside the house, without being able to devote their time to family or emotional relationships’ care. These services have become affordable for rich people, while on the other side, lower or middle class members occupy these jobs positions. Besides, “in their more recent incarnation, the commercial substitutes family activities often turn out to be better than the real thing”. Therefore, companies do not compete against each other, but with families.
Commodification is moving into the domain of our private life and desires, creating an ambivalence; by purchasing goods and services that simulate family-like experience, we want, on one hand, to live some authentic experiences, like the one we experienced in the past with our family, but at the same time, we are enhancing the commodification of these practices by drawing upon these services.

Examples in modern society

Valentine’s day
Valentine's Day, also known as Saint Valentine's Day, is a religious celebration observed on 14 February each year, also if in some countries it is celebrated in different occasions. In Russia and in the Eastern Orthodox Church in general Valentines’ day is celebrated on 6 and 30 July, while in Brazil the Dia de São Valentim is recognized on 12 June. 
During this day, traditionally, lovers exchange symbols and commodities to show their sentiments to each other. This tradition developed during the 19th century in England, where people started to express their love for each other by donating flowers, offering sweets and exchanging handwritten greeting cards (known as "valentines"), that rapidly were replaced with mass-produced ones. In the later 20th and early 21st centuries, this Valentine's Day tradition spread to other countries, arriving in some East Asian countries with globalization and concentrated marketing strategies, becoming a worldwide celebration differentiated in each country with several peculiarities and behaviors.

Online dating
Internet has revolutionized courtship by becoming the biggest love mall around here. Nowadays finding love is considered a work and a lot of people do not think they are able to do it on their own. For this reason single people see dating websites as a support that will help them to find the perfect partner.
Finding your soulmates and sexual chemistry are exactly the core ideas, the pillars at the bottom of love seekers’ industry. In fact, dating websites’ users behave like shoppers: they have a list of desired qualities and or physical characteristics they look for in a partner; you have only few seconds to brand yourself, make a good impression and be chosen among thousands of other people before being rejected with a click. Internet dating isn’t always as rewarding as it may appear: sometimes people remain hurt because they invest money, time and feelings in it but they still can’t find the “right” person or face problems with users who lie about their age, drug habits or marital status. Some websites, by embracing the spirit of capitalism and applying statistics to love, even provide their “clients” with surveys using pie charts, graph or rating systems such as ROI and CSI (Couple Satisfaction Index). The industry of love has also devoted some websites to matching daters by religion, ethnicity, sexual orientation, disabilities and even level of intelligence.

Outsourcing of care and love
In her essay “Love and Gold”, Hochschild explains that nowadays the world is facing a particular global trend: care and love importation from poor countries to rich nations is increasing sharply. Professionals from the developing countries leave their workplaces for better job opportunities and higher salaries in richer countries, usually in Europe or in the United States.  However, this trend widens the gap between poor and rich countries. Today, there is a parallel trend, in which care workers started to leave developing countries to care for children, elders, and sick people in richer nations. Therefore, due to the growing demand for care workers, a large number of women is migrating in order to find jobs as nurses, nannies, and so on. These jobs allow women to send home enough money to sustain their families; in the words of Hochschild: “migration has become a private solution to a public problem”.

Half of the world's migrants are now constituted by women, who emigrate to find mostly domestic jobs. In this process, not only time and energy are involved, but also love; in this situation, we can consider love as a resource that is extracted from one place and "consumed" somewhere else. As reported by Hochschild : "If love is a resource, it's a renewable resource; it creates more of itself". Love and feelings are profitable resources, but we do not invest feelings, we find a new object towards to redirect it.

The richest/upper-class families invite nannies to displace their love towards their own children; many families welcome the fact that the nanny would import her native culture values. They identify their care practices as more relaxed, patient and joyful.

Love as a resource is not just extracted from poor countries and then imported in the richest ones. It is created, or rather assembled, with elements that come from both cultural environments. The love that nannies express, once migrated, towards children i is partially produced in the richer countries, and it is also the outcome of money, ideology, loneliness and yearning for their sons and daughters. The suffering of these women is not visible to the nannies’ employers; they just focus on the love that nannies show towards their children. Therefore, nanny’s love becomes a "thing itself. It is unique, private – fetishized". While objectifying a concept, we start to consider it outside its natural context. By isolating the concept of care from the context in which is produced, we unconsciously separate the logic of nanny love from the economic and capitalist context in which is created.

In popular culture

Dating websites
 Match.com
 eHarmony
 OkCupid
 Perfectmatch.com
 BeautifulPeople.com
 Catholic Mingle
 AdventistSingles
 LDS Mingle

Dating-based reality shows
 The Bachelor
 Temptation Island
 Love in the Wild
 The Cougar
 If You Are The One

Nannies in movies and television programs
 Mary Poppins
 Mrs. Doubtfire
 Nanny McPhee
 Nanny 911
 Supernanny

See also
 Capitalism
 Commodification
 Commoditization
 Consumerism
 Consumption
 Love

References

 Eva Illouz,  Consuming the Romantic Utopia. Love and the Cultural Contradictions of Capitalism.
 Pamela Ilyse Epstein, Selling Love: The Commercialization of Intimacy in America, 1800s–1990s.
 Sérgio Costa, Easy Loving. Romanticism and Consumerism in Late Modernity.

External links
 Hochschild's web site at UC Berkeley
 The Outsourced Life(NYTimes.com: May 5, 2012)
 "Love in the Time of Capital", an interview with Illouz in Guernica Magazine

Love
Ethically disputed business practices
Commodification